The Women's slalom competition of the Lake Placid 1980 Olympics was held at Whiteface Mountain.

The defending world champion was Lea Solkner of Austria, while Austria's Regina Sackl was the defending World Cup slalom champion and France's Perrine Pelen led the 1980 World Cup.

Results

References 

Women's slalom
Alp
Oly